St Mark with Saints Leonard and Catherine of Alexandria (Italian ) is an oil painting by Francesco Beccaruzzi. It is preserved in the cathedral in Conegliano, the artist's hometown.

References

1504 paintings
Catholic paintings
Paintings in Treviso
Paintings of Catherine of Alexandria